Gisela Ellenberger (born 12 July 1950) is a German middle-distance runner. She competed in the women's 800 metres at the 1972 Summer Olympics.

References

1950 births
Living people
Athletes (track and field) at the 1972 Summer Olympics
German female middle-distance runners
Olympic athletes of West Germany
Place of birth missing (living people)